The 1964 CONCACAF Pre-Olympic Tournament was the first edition of the CONCACAF Pre-Olympic Tournament, the quadrennial, international football tournament organised by CONCACAF to determine which national teams from the North, Central America and Caribbean region qualify for the Olympic football tournament. It was held in Mexico, from 16 and 20 March 1964.

Host nation, Mexico, won the tournament and qualified for the 1964 Summer Olympics as the sole representative of CONCACAF.

Qualification

Qualified teams
The following teams qualified for the final tournament.

1 Only final tournament.

Venue
Mexico City hosted the tournament.

Squads

Final round

Statistics

Goalscorers

Qualified team for Summer Olympics
The following team from CONCACAF qualified for the 1964 Summer Olympics.

2 Bold indicates champions for that year. Italic indicates hosts for that year.

References

1964
Oly
 
Football qualification for the 1964 Summer Olympics